Carolina Miranda Olvera (June 25, 1990, Irapuato, Guanajuato, Mexico) is a Mexican television actress. She obtained her first character in the telenovela Los Rey, then in Las Bravo. She starred in the series Señora Acero, after the departure of Blanca Soto.

Filmography

Awards and nominations

References

External links 
 

1989 births
Living people
Mexican television actresses